Eva Ranaweera (19249 February 2010) was feminist writer, poet and journalist who wrote in both English and Sinhala. She was the first editor of the magazine Vanitha Viththi.

Biography 
Ranaweera was born to a privileged Sri Lankan family and grew up speaking only English. Her family had worked for the British colonial administration in what was then Ceylon. She attended Holy Cross College, Gampaha. She studied English, History and Sinhala at the University of Colombo from 1949 to 1953. She later wrote in both English and Sinhala, and published books and articles in both languages. 

After university she joined the Sinhala-language newspaper Lankadeepa, despite the fact she was just beginning to learn the language. Her first assignments were to translate articles from English to Sinhala. After four years at the newspaper, she resigned and began work at the University of Colombo as a translator. However she resigned shortly afterwards and began to travel around the world, visiting Switzerland, Russia, China, India and Vietnam, as well as working in Egypt. She returned to Sr Lanka and became the first editor of the popular women's magazine Vanitha Viththi. A feminist, Ranaweera used her writing and her activism to broaden the horizons of women, particularly those in rural areas. She published five volumes of poetry in English, which included her first publication.

Ranaweera died on 9 February 2010. At the time of her death she was editing the journal Voices of Women, which was published by the feminist organisation Kantha Handa. Her funeral took place on 11 February 2010 at Kanatte cemetery in Borella.

Reception 
Described as "a bilingual writer par excellence", Ranaweera was also praised for her depictions of rural working class voices in the novels Laisa and Sedona. She is recognised for her use of stream-of-consciousness in both novels. This has led to comparisons with James Joyce and Siri Gunasinghe. According to S.B. Anuruddhika Kumari Kularathna, her novels can be "located in the context of subaltern studies, Post colonialism and Feminism". Her poetry was described by L W Conolly as both "strong and emotive" and "occasionally humdrum". Her novel Sedona was adapted into an award-winning television in Sri Lanka.

Ranaweera was noted as one of a small number of Anglophone writers, who chose to stay in Sri Lanka after its civil war, rather than flee to the West.

Awards

State Literary Award 

 1998 - With Maya
 1993 - When we returned without you

Gratiaen Prize 

 2000 (shortlisted) - Blissfully.
 1996 (shortlisted) - With Maya.
 1994 (shortlisted) - What Will you Do Do Do Clara, What Will you do?

Selected publications

In Sinhalese

Novels 

 Laisa (1967)
 Sedona (1973)

Drama 

 Attakamal Paravagiya (1993)
 Pin Gona
 Lovi Gahe Pilila
 Ehata Vahala Nil Ahasai
 Samanala Uyana
 Maha Andakaraya

Short stories 

 Mora Kele
 Atara Maga

In English

Poetry 

 What will you do do do Clara what will you do? (1994)
 When we returned without you
 With Maya (1997)
 Blissfully
 Ending with beginning (2001)

Non-fiction 

 Some Literary Women of Sri Lanka (1991)

References 

1924 births
2010 deaths
Alumni of the University of Ceylon (Colombo)
People from British Ceylon
Sinhalese journalists
Sinhalese poets
Sinhalese writers
Sri Lankan editors
Sri Lankan feminists
Sri Lankan women journalists
Sri Lankan women poets
Sri Lankan women writers
Women magazine editors